Materials science in science fiction is the study of how materials science is portrayed in works of science fiction. The accuracy of the materials science portrayed spans a wide range – sometimes it is an extrapolation of existing technology, sometimes it is a physically realistic portrayal of a far-out technology, and sometimes it is simply a plot device that looks scientific, but has no basis in science. Examples are:
Realistic: In 1944, the science fiction story "Deadline" by Cleve Cartmill depicted the atomic bomb. The properties of various radioactive isotopes are critical to the proposed device, and the plot. This technology was real, unknown to the author.
Extrapolation: In the 1979 novel The Fountains of Paradise, Arthur C. Clarke wrote about space elevators - basically long cables extending from the Earth's surface to geosynchronous orbit. These require a material with enormous tensile strength and light weight. Carbon nanotubes are strong enough in theory, so the idea is plausible; while one cannot be built today, it violates no physical principles.
Plot device: An example of an unsupported plot device is scrith, the material used to construct Ringworld, in the novels by Larry Niven. Scrith has unreasonable strength, and is unsupported by known physics, but needed for the plot.

Critical analysis of materials science in science fiction falls into the same general categories. The predictive aspects are emphasized, for example, in the motto of the Georgia Tech's department of materials science and engineering – Materials scientists lead the way in turning yesterday's science fiction into tomorrow's reality. This is also the theme of many technical articles, such as Material By Design: Future Science or Science Fiction?, found in IEEE Spectrum, the flagship magazine of Institute of Electrical and Electronics Engineers.

On the other hand, there is criticism of the unrealistic materials science used in science fiction. In the professional materials science journal JOM, for example, there are articles such as The (Mostly Improbable) Materials Science and Engineering of the Star Wars Universe and Personification: The Materials Science and Engineering of Humanoid Robots.

Examples 

In many cases, the materials science aspect of a fictional work was interesting enough that someone other than the author has remarked on it. Here are some examples, and their relationship to real world materials science usage, if any.

See also
Science in science fiction
Hypothetical types of biochemistry.  Most of these potential types of biochemistry have been used in science fiction.
Unobtainium
List of fictional elements, materials, isotopes and atomic particles
:Category:Fictional materials
:Category:Physics in fiction

References

The Science in Science Fiction by Brian Stableford, David Langford, & Peter Nicholls (1982)

Science in fiction by theme
Materials science
Science in popular culture